Zonoplusia is a genus of moths of the family Noctuidae.

Species
 Zonoplusia ochreata Walker, 1865

References
 Natural History Museum Lepidoptera genus database
 Zonoplusia at funet.fi

Plusiinae